Reliance Entertainment Pvt Ltd is an Indian media and entertainment company. It is a division of Reliance Group, handling its media and entertainment business, across content and distribution platforms. The company was founded on 15 February 2005, as two entities, namely Reliance Big Entertainment and BIG Pictures. Four years later the two companies were merged into Reliance BIG Pictures in 2009, and the company's name was changed to Reliance Entertainment the following year.

The key content initiatives are across movies, music, sports, gaming, Internet & mobile portals, leading to direct opportunities in delivery across the emerging digital distribution platforms: digital cinema, IPTV, DTH and mobile TV.

Subsidiaries

Current 
 Storyteller Holding Co., LLC (Amblin Partners) (investor, 20%)
 Amblin Entertainment – Family-Friendly Label
 DreamWorks Pictures –  Mature Label
 Amblin Television – Television Division
 Storyteller Distribution Co. LLC – Copyright Holder

 Reliance Animation (formerly BIG Animation) – (Airtight Info media)
Phantom Films (50% owned)
 Big Home Entertainment – Home Video Division
 Big Music – Record Label Division
 BIG Star Entertainment Awards
 Jump Games (ParadoX Studios)
 Lava Bear Films
 Riverstone Pictures
 Reliance Big Pictures – Movie Production & Distribution Division
 Reliance Games – Mobile Games Development Studio
 Reliance Media Works Ltd
 Big ND Studios
 Big Synergy – Non Fiction TV Production Division
 Reliance MediaWorks (formerly Lowry Digital)
 Reliance Media Works Studio – Filmcity Mumbai
 Talenthouse
 Window Seat Films
 Digital Domain

Former 
 IM Global – 80% sold to Tang Media Partners in 2016; merged with Open Road Films into Global Road Entertainment in 2017
 AutoMatik (joint venture with Entertainment One)
 IM Global Television – Television division
 Codemasters (29% owned until January 2021)

History 

 Reliance forayed into the largely untapped video rental market in India by launching BIGFlix.
 The company plans to launch TV Channels.
 On 15 July 2009, Reliance and Steven Spielberg announced a joint venture with funding of $825 million.
 Big 92.7 FM launched a radio station in Singapore considering 8% of the population residing there is Indian.
 On 5 April 2010, Reliance acquired a 50% stake in Codemasters.
 On 28 May 2010, the company achieved the first ever Hollywood box office market with the release of Kites.
 Reliance co-produced director Steven Spielberg's film  War Horse, which was released worldwide on Christmas Day in 2011. Many other projects from the director also have the company as a producer.
 In January 2012, it was announced that Reliance DreamWorks movies garnered 11 Oscar nominations.
 In November 2014, the company announced plans to begin the acquisition process of the North American and European mobile game studios of DreamWorks Studios in early 2015.

Films

Bengali

Hindi

Punjabi

Tamil

Telugu

Kannada

Malayalam

English

French

Spanish

Web series and TV 
One of its subsidiaries, Phantom Films run by the likes of Vikramaditya Motwane and Anurag Kashyap is actively contributing to web series. They are currently developing two more web series for Amazon; Stardust and Vish Puri, the former being directed by Motwane himself and the latter will be helmed by Ashwiny Iyer Tiwary.

Big Synergy, its other subsidiary, was responsible for shows like Bose: Dead/Alive with ALTBalaji and Yay kay hua Bro with Voot.

References

External links 
 

 
Entertainment companies of India
Film distributors of India
Film production companies based in Mumbai
Mass media companies based in Mumbai
Indian companies established in 2005
Entertainment companies established in 2005
Mass media companies established in 2005
Reliance Group subsidiaries
Producers who won the Best Feature Film National Film Award
Producers who won the Best Film on Other Social Issues National Film Award
2005 establishments in Maharashtra